The 2021 Michigan Wolverines softball team was an American college softball team that represented the University of Michigan during the 2021 NCAA Division I softball season. The Wolverines were led by head coach Carol Hutchins in her thirty-seventh season, and played their home games at Alumni Field in Ann Arbor, Michigan.

Previous season
The Wolverines finished the 2020 season 15–8 overall, in a season shortened due to the COVID-19 pandemic.

Preseason
Michigan was ranked No. 17 by NFCA/USA Today and ESPN.com/USA Softball, No. 18 by D1Softball, and No. 20 by Softball America in the preseason polls, the only Big Ten Conference team named in each poll.

Roster

Schedule and results

!  style="" | Regular Season (36–6)
|- valign="top"

|- align="center" bgcolor="#ccffcc"
|February 26|| vs.  ||  || Sleepy Hollow Sports ComplexLeesburg, FL || 4–0 || Beaubien (1–0) || Bates (0–1) || — || 100 || 1–0 || 1–0 
|- align="center" bgcolor="#ccffcc"
|February 26|| vs. Purdue || No. 17 || Sleepy Hollow Sports Complex || 4–0 || Storako (1–0) || Henley (0–1) || — || 100 || 2–0 || 2–0 
|- align="center" bgcolor="#ccffcc"
|February 27|| vs. || No. 17 || Sleepy Hollow Sports Complex || 2–0 ||  || Doocy (0–1) || — || 0 || 3–0 || 3–0 
|- align="center" bgcolor="#ccffcc"
|February 27|| vs. Iowa || No. 17 || Sleepy Hollow Sports Complex || 6–5 || Storako (2–0) || Loecker (0–1) || — || 0 || 4–0 || 4–0
|- align="center" bgcolor="#ffdddd"
|February 28|| vs.  || No. 17 || Sleepy Hollow Sports Complex || 1–2 || Sickels (2–1) ||  || — || 0 || 4–1 || 4–1
|- align="center" bgcolor="#ffdddd"
|February 28|| vs. Illinois || No. 17 || Sleepy Hollow Sports Complex || 1–2 || Jarvis (3–0) || Storako (2–1) ||  || 0 || 4–2 || 4–2
|-

|- align="center" bgcolor="#ccffcc"
|March 11|| vs.  || No. 23 || Sleepy Hollow Sports Complex || 2–1 (8) || Beaubien (3–1) || Ferrell (1–4) || — || 86 || 5–2 || 5–2
|- align="center" bgcolor="#ccffcc"
|March 11|| vs. Nebraska || No. 23 || Sleepy Hollow Sports Complex || 2–0 || Storako (3–1) || Wallace (2–1) || — || 74 || 6–2 || 6–2
|- align="center" bgcolor="#ffdddd"
|March 12|| vs. Nebraska || No. 23 || Sleepy Hollow Sports Complex || 4–5 (8) || Wallace (3–1) || Storako (3–2) || — || 74 || 6–3 || 6–3
|- align="center" bgcolor="#ccffcc"
|March 13|| vs.  || No. 23 || Sleepy Hollow Sports Complex || 8–0 (5) || Storako (4–2) || Schwartz (2–3) || — || 66 || 7–3 || 7–3
|- align="center" bgcolor="#ccffcc"
|March 13|| vs. Wisconsin || No. 23 || Sleepy Hollow Sports Complex || 3–0 || Storako (5–2) || Schwartz (2–4) || — || 66 || 8–3 || 8–3
|- align="center" bgcolor="#ccffcc"
|March 14|| vs. Wisconsin || No. 23 || Sleepy Hollow Sports Complex || 2–1 || Storako (6–2) || Hestekin (2–1) || — || 59 || 9–3 || 9–3
|- align="center" bgcolor="#ccffcc"
|March 26|| at  || No. 25 || Andy Mohr FieldBloomington, IN || 7–1 || Beaubien (4–1) || Goodin (3–3) || — || 98 || 10–3 || 10–3
|- align="center" bgcolor="#ccffcc"
|March 27|| at Indiana || No. 25 || Andy Mohr Field || 3–1 (9) || Storako (7–2) || Goodin (3–4) || — || 103 || 11–3 || 11–3
|- align="center" bgcolor="#ccffcc"
|March 27|| at Indiana || No. 25 || Andy Mohr Field || 8–1 || Beaubien (5–1) || Goodin (3–5) || — || 103 || 12–3 || 12–3
|- align="center" bgcolor="#ccffcc"
|March 28|| at Indiana || No. 25 || Andy Mohr Field || 4–0 || Storako (8–2) || Goodin (3–6) || — || 56 || 13–3 || 13–3
|-

|- align="center" bgcolor="#bbbbbb"
|April 2 ||  || No. 23 || Alumni FieldAnn Arbor, MI || colspan=9| Postponed due to COVID-19 protocols
|- align="center" bgcolor="#bbbbbb"
|April 3 || Michigan State || No. 23 || Alumni Field || colspan=9| Postponed due to COVID-19 protocols
|- align="center" bgcolor="#bbbbbb"
|April 3 || Michigan State || No. 23 || Alumni Field || colspan=9| Postponed due to COVID-19 protocols
|- align="center" bgcolor="#bbbbbb"
|April 4 || Michigan State || No. 23 || Alumni Field || colspan=9| Postponed due to COVID-19 protocols
|- align="center" bgcolor="#ccffcc"
|April 9 || at  || No. 23 || Buckeye FieldColumbus, OH|| 7–0 || Beaubien (6–1) || Buresch (5–2) || — || 150 || 14–3 || 14–3 
|- align="center" bgcolor="#ccffcc"
|April 10 || at Ohio State || No. 23 || Buckeye Field || 3–1 || Storako (9–2) || Smith (7–6) || — || 177 || 15–3 || 15–3
|- align="center" bgcolor="#ffdddd"
|April 10 || at Ohio State || No. 23 || Buckeye Field || 2–3 || Buresch (6–2) || Beaubien (6–2) || — || 164 || 15–4 || 15–4
|- align="center" bgcolor="#ccffcc"
|April 11 || at Ohio State || No. 23 || Buckeye Field || 11–0 || Storako (10–2) || Smith (7–7) || — || 151 || 16–4 || 16–4
|- align="center" bgcolor="#ccffcc"
|April 14 || Michigan State || No. 22 || Alumni Field || 6–1 || Storako (11–2) || Ladd (2–6) || — || 93 || 17–4 || 17–4
|- align="center" bgcolor="#ccffcc"
|April 16 ||  || No. 22 || Alumni Field || 4–2 || Beaubien (7–2) || Brann (3–5) || — || 96 || 18–4 || 18–4
|- align="center" bgcolor="#ccffcc"
|April 17 || Maryland || No. 22 || Alumni Field || 2–0 || Storako (12–2) || Wyche (2–4) || — || 138 || 19–4 || 19–4
|- align="center" bgcolor="#ccffcc"
|April 17 || Maryland || No. 22 || Alumni Field || 5–1 || Beaubien (8–2) || Ellefson (1–2) || — || 138 || 20–4 || 20–4
|- align="center" bgcolor="#ccffcc"
|April 18 || Maryland || No. 22 || Alumni Field || 8–0 (5) || Storako (13–2) || Wyche (2–5) || — || 123 || 21–4 || 21–4 
|- align="center" bgcolor="#ffdddd"
|April 23 ||  || No. 20 || Alumni Field || 1–4 || Williams (13–2) || Beaubien (8–3) || — || 192 || 21–5 || 21–5
|- align="center" bgcolor="#ccffcc"
|April 24 || Northwestern || No. 20 || Alumni Field || 7–2 || Storako (14–2) || Boyd (3–2) || — || 181 || 22–5 || 22–5
|- align="center" bgcolor="#ccffcc"
|April 24 || Northwestern || No. 20 || Alumni Field || 6–3 || Beaubien (9–3) || Williams (13–3) || — || 181 || 23–5 || 23–5
|- align="center" bgcolor="#ccffcc"
|April 25 || Northwestern || No. 20 || Alumni Field || 2–0 || Storako (15–2) || Newport (4–3) || — || 164 || 24–5 || 24–5
|- align="center" bgcolor="#ccffcc"
|April 30 || at  || No. 19 || Beard FieldState College, PA || 7–1 || Beaubien (10–3) || Parshall (1–13) || — || 118 || 25–5 || 25–5
|-

|- align="center" bgcolor="#ccffcc"
|May 1 || at Penn State ||  || Beard Field ||  || Storako (16–2) ||  || — || 166 || 26–5 || 26–5
|- align="center" bgcolor="#ccffcc"
|May 1 || at Penn State || No. 19 || Beard Field || 12–2 (6) ||  || Oatley (3–3) || — || 166 || 27–5 || 27–5
|- align="center" bgcolor="#ccffcc"
|May 2 || at Penn State || No. 19 || Beard Field || 5–3 || Storako (17–2) || Parshall (1–14) ||  || 155 || 28–5 || 28–5
|- align="center" bgcolor="#ccffcc"
|May 5 || at Michigan State || No. 19 || Secchia StadiumEast Lansing, MI || 1–0 (9) || Storako (18–2) || Miller (6–7) || — || 0 || 29–5 || 29–5
|- align="center" bgcolor="#ccffcc"
|May 7 ||  || No. 19 || Jane Sage Cowles StadiumMinneapolis, MN || 3–0 ||  || Fiser (12–5) || Storako (1) || 0 || 30–5 || 30–5 
|- align="center" bgcolor="#ccffcc"
|May 8 || at No. 23 Minnesota || No. 19 || Jane Sage Cowles Stadium || 10–4 || Storako (19–2) || Fiser (12–7) || — || 0 || 31–5 || 31–5
|- align="center" bgcolor="#ccffcc"
|May 8 || at No. 23 Minnesota || No. 19 || Jane Sage Cowles Stadium || 3–1 || Beaubien (13–3) || Pease (11–2) || — || 0 || 32–5 || 32–5 
|- align="center" bgcolor="#ffdddd"
|May 9 || at No. 23 Minnesota || No. 19 || Jane Sage Cowles Stadium || 3–7 || Fiser (13–7) || Storako (19–3) || — || 0 || 32–6 || 32–6
|- align="center" bgcolor="#ccffcc"
|May 14 ||  || No. 18 || Alumni Field || 3–0 || Beaubien (14–3) ||  Hitchcock (5–15) || — || 207 || 33–6 || 33–6
|- align="center" bgcolor="#ccffcc"
|May 15 || Rutgers || No. 18 || Alumni Field || 13–0 (5) || Storako (20–3) || Vickers (0–4) || — || 143 || 34–6 || 34–6
|- align="center" bgcolor="#ccffcc"
|May 15 || Rutgers || No. 18 || Alumni Field || 11–0 (5) || Beaubien (15–3) || Hitchcock (5–16) || — || 143 || 35–6 || 35–6
|- align="center" bgcolor="#ccffcc"
|May 16 || Rutgers || No. 18 || Alumni Field || 2–1 || Storako (21–3) || Hitchcock (5–17) || — || 140 || 36–6 || 36–6
|-

|-
! style="" | Postseason (2–2)
|-

|-
|- align="center" bgcolor="#ccffcc"
| May 21 || Seattle || No. 20 || Husky Softball StadiumSeattle, WA || 2–0 ||  || Nance (10–6) || — || 250 || 37–6 || 1–0
|-
|- align="center" bgcolor="#ccffcc"
| May 22 ||  || No. 20 || Husky Softball Stadium || 2–1 || Storako (22–3) || Plain (30–3) || — || 250 || 38–6 || 2–0
|- align="center" bgcolor="#ffdddd"
| May 23 || No. 6 Washington (16) || No. 20 || Husky Softball Stadium || 0–2 || Plain (31–3) ||  || — || 200 || 38–7 || 2–1
|- align="center" bgcolor="#ffdddd"
| May 23 || No. 6 Washington (16) || No. 20 || Husky Softball Stadium || 5–10 || Plain (32–3) || Beaubien (16–5) || — || 200 || 38–8 || 2–2
|-

|-
|

Rankings

Awards and honors

References

Michigan Wolverines
Michigan Wolverines softball
Michigan Wolverines softball seasons
Big Ten Conference softball champion seasons
Michigan